Virginia's 25th Senate district is one of 40 districts in the Senate of Virginia. It has been represented by Democrat Creigh Deeds since a 2001 special election to replace deceased fellow Democrat Emily Couric.

Geography
District 25 is based in the City of Charlottesville and much of surrounding Albemarle County, stretching to also include all of Alleghany County, Bath County, Highland County, Nelson County, Rockbridge County, and the cities of Buena Vista, Covington, and Lexington.

The district overlaps with Virginia's 5th, 6th and 9th congressional districts, and with the 19th, 20th, 24th, 25th, 57th, 58th, and 59th districts of the Virginia House of Delegates. It borders the state of West Virginia.

Recent election results

2019

2015

2011

Federal and statewide results in District 25

Historical results
All election results below took place prior to 2011 redistricting, and thus were under different district lines.

2007

2003

2001 special

1999

1995

References

Albemarle County, Virginia
Charlottesville, Virginia
Rockbridge County, Virginia
Nelson County, Virginia
Alleghany County, Virginia
Lexington, Virginia
Covington, Virginia
Bath County, Virginia
Highland County, Virginia
Virginia Senate districts